Barry Oringer (December 3, 1935 – January 10, 2021) was an American producer and screenwriter. He was known for writing the pilot episode of the American soap opera television series Hotel with John Furia Jr.

Life and career
Born in New York, Oringer was raised in a Jewish family. He attended Brooklyn College, where he earned a Bachelor of Arts degree in drama and English. 

Oringer began his career in 1962, when he wrote the English script for Curtis Bernhardt's film Damon and Pythias. He then wrote for television programs including The Invaders, Mannix, The Fugitive, Ben Casey, Barnaby Jones, The F.B.I., Lancer and The Virginian.

Oringer died in January 2021, of Lewy body disease at his home in Novato, California, at the age of 85. He was buried in Bolinas Cemetery.

References

External links 

1935 births
2021 deaths
Television producers from New York (state)
Screenwriters from New York (state)
American male screenwriters
American soap opera writers
American male television writers
20th-century American screenwriters
20th-century American male writers
American television producers
Brooklyn College alumni
Deaths from Lewy body dementia